County Road 482 (Vest-Agder) in the Torridal valley (east bank of Otra) is a road between Kristiansand and Vennesla municipality, Norway.

Major intersections

References

482